Ernst Haabpiht (also Ernst Habicht; 21 August 1898 Helme Parish (now Tõrva Parish), Kreis Fellin – 4 May 1942 Sevurallag, Sverdlovsk Oblast) was an Estonian politician. He was a member of VI Riigikogu (its Chamber of Deputies).

References

1898 births
1942 deaths
People from Tõrva Parish
People from Kreis Fellin
Patriotic League (Estonia) politicians
Members of the Estonian National Assembly
Members of the Riigivolikogu
Estonian military personnel of the Estonian War of Independence
Estonian people executed by the Soviet Union